Habon Ali is a Rexdale, Toronto based community leader and advocate. 

She has served on the Youth Council of Justin Trudeau and led efforts in 2020 to support Somali-Canadian survivors of gender based violence.

She is being outspoken against the Canadian governments purchase of the Trans Mountain Pipeline and their handing of the COVID-19 pandemic.

Early life 
Ali's is one of seven children born to Somali parents who arrived in Canada as refugees fleeing Somalia's civil war. She is Muslim.

Education 
Ali studied biology and environmental studies at University of Toronto and did her Master's degree McMaster University. She was the University of Toronto Mississauga's valedictorian for the class of 2020.

Ali is a Schwarzman Scholar, class of 2023.

Advocacy and influence 
Ali has previously served on the Youth Advisory Council of Justin Trudeau, having been appointed in 2018. While on the council she criticized the government's decision to purchase the Trans Mountain Pipeline.

Following to the 2020 death of Oluwatoyin Salau, Habon Ali collaborated with Asmaa Ali to compile a list of resources to support Somali-Canadian survivors of sexual and gender based violence.

Ali was part of a team that created Canada's first National Youth Policy.

In November 2020, Ali was critical of the Government of Canada's response to the COVID-19 pandemic, stating that even when young people were dying there was a lack of action from them.

In Nov 2021, Ali was named as a "Future Leader" in the Financial Post.

Ali is a member of the Future of Canada Project Council.

Family life 
Ali has six siblings, including one brother who has a rare genetic disorder.

References

External links 

 Ali, Habon and Ali, Asmaa, 2020, Basic and immediate sexual violence resources for Somali Canadians

Year of birth missing (living people)
Living people
University of Toronto alumni
McMaster University alumni
Youth activists